In probability and statistics, the Gompertz distribution is a continuous probability distribution, named after Benjamin Gompertz. The Gompertz distribution is often applied to describe the distribution of adult lifespans by demographers and actuaries. Related fields of science such as biology and gerontology also considered the Gompertz distribution for the analysis of survival. More recently, computer scientists have also started to model the failure rates of computer code by the Gompertz distribution. In Marketing Science, it has been used as an individual-level simulation for customer lifetime value modeling. In network theory, particularly the Erdős–Rényi model, the walk length of a random self-avoiding walk (SAW) is distributed according to the Gompertz distribution.

Specification

Probability density function

The probability density function of the Gompertz distribution is:

In the actuarial and biological sciences and in demography, the Gompertz distribution is parametrized slightly differently (Gompertz–Makeham law of mortality).

Cumulative distribution function

The cumulative distribution function of the Gompertz distribution is:

where  and

Moment generating function
The moment generating function is:

where

Properties 
The Gompertz distribution is a flexible distribution that can be skewed to the right and to the left. The model can be fitted into the innovation-imitation paradigm with 
When  becomes large,  approaches . The model can also belong to the propensity-to-adopt paradigm with  

Shapes
The Gompertz density function can take on different shapes depending on the values of the shape parameter :
 When  the probability density function has its mode at 0.
 When  the probability density function has its mode at

Kullback-Leibler divergence

Related distributions 
If X is defined to be the result of sampling from a Gumbel distribution until a negative value Y is produced, and setting X=−Y, then X has a Gompertz distribution.
The gamma distribution is a natural conjugate prior to a Gompertz likelihood with known scale parameter 

 If , then , and hence .

Applications 
 In hydrology the Gompertz distribution is applied to extreme events such as annual maximum one-day rainfalls and river discharges. The blue picture illustrates an example of fitting the Gompertz distribution to ranked annually maximum one-day rainfalls showing also the 90% confidence belt based on the binomial distribution. The rainfall data are represented by plotting positions as part of the cumulative frequency analysis.

See also 
Gompertz-Makeham law of mortality
Gompertz function
Customer lifetime value
Gamma Gompertz distribution

Notes

References

Continuous distributions
Survival analysis
Actuarial science